Prophecy